Although the Váci Mihály Gimnázium is not the biggest school in the North Eastern region, it has always preserved its own traditions, teaching methods suitable for any of the students and remained a strong institution. The prior aim was to prepare the upgrowing generations for higher education. Statistics shows that the Váci Mihály Gimnázium belongs to the better schools when considering students leaving for universities and colleges. Those who had studied here make the intellectual part of the town. Pupils can be found not only in Hungary, but also abroad. For those who do not carry on studies, the school provides the essential knowledge to choose the most suitable profession.

History 

The forerunner of the Váci Mihály Gimnázium was founded between 1963 and 1970 in Tiszavasvári as „Kabay János” Általános iskola és Gimnázium.  It contained a ground school and a high school to provide a persistent development of classes.
With the help of the former chemical factory, Alkaloida and the agrarian Mezőgép vállalat, a program of 5+1 years long faculties in Chemical and electric reeling vocational training began in 1965–69.
In 1970 the independent high school having its own administration moved to a new building as Gimnázium Tiszavasvári which means High School of Tiszavasvári''.
Between 1972 and 1978, chemistry classes began in every grades for students from the shire. The school provided accommodation in the building for students living further. The dorm was built in 1973 at the end of the corridor leading to the gym.
In 1974, the high school adopted the famous writer's name, Váci Mihály.
A facultative training  was introduced in 1978, which meant that students could choose either any of the theoretical subjects or a chemical test with a final examination added to the main education every year. This facultative system was dissolved in 1996 because of the inaugural of the modification educational act in 1993.
With the modernization of the heating in 1986, gas furnaces were established. A year later, instead of the coal storage, volunteers built up the health club after introducing this gas heating. Within another year, in 1987 a tennis court.
In 1992 an intensive English teaching commenced in an augmented number of lessons based on American connections and on the Teach Hungary program provided by the cooperation of the British Council and the Department of Community and Public Education.
Since 1993, supporters enabled students take part in boating as a free time activity. Two rooms were transmitted, one as a language teaching classroom for 16 people and another with modern computers.
The new education in 6 years began in 1994 based on the syllabus of the Krúdy Gyula Gimnázium. The first grade in this system began in the following year.
Some years later, in 1997, enterprise studies was provided for the inquirers with the help of Applied economics.
1998 was a significant year in this history, which was the appearance of German teaching besides the English department. The Sulinet program contributed to the developments in the computer equipment when the school had the first opportunity to connect to the internet.
The high school has been concerned with teaching adults since the beginnings. In the very first years, the Technical College for Skilled Workers provided part-time education for graduation in 3 years. The nowadays' present high school education has been existing since 1996. Full-time education for 2 years for those who have a profession and are less than the age of 22, began in 1998.

Directors

Gál József
Vig József
Litkei Lászlóné
Szűcs József

Free time activities 
These include: an evening for the first year students; a school leavers' ball; carnivals; a students' day; amateur theatre and choir performances; handball, basketball, and football championships; skiing and boating tours; class trips for up to 3 days; trips abroad; a scientific week full of competitions and interesting lectures or chemical evenings

References 
 Váci Mihály Gimnázium; skola törtenet (in Hungarian)

Schools in Hungary
Educational institutions established in 1970